The Saudi Second Division , also known as the Second Division League (SDL), is a football league that is the third tier of the Saudi Arabian football league system. The league consists of 32 teams divided into two groups and was founded in 1976.

Promotion and relegation
The top 3 teams are promoted to the First Division League.
The first two teams of each group will advance directly to the First Division League, and the second two teams of each group will compete in two round-trip matches, and the winning team will advance to the First Division League as the third team.
The bottom two clubs of each group are relegated to the Third Division League.

Club performances 
Source:

Promotions by season

Performance by club

The first two teams of each group will compete in a game (hosted by the team with the highest score) and the winner of the game will be declared the champion.

See also
 Saudi Arabia Football Federation

References

External links

 Saudi Arabia Football Federation
 Saudi Arabia Second Division - Hailoosport.com (Arabic)
 Saudi Arabia Second Division - Hailoosport.com

 
3
Third level football leagues in Asia